Oberea yaoshana is a species of beetle in the family Cerambycidae. It was described by Gressitt in 1942. It is known from China.

References

Beetles described in 1942
yaoshana